Gorkys Gustavo Hernández Lugo (born September 7, 1987) is a Venezuelan professional baseball outfielder who is a free agent. Hernandez signed with the Detroit Tigers in 2005. He previously played in Major League Baseball (MLB) for the Pittsburgh Pirates, Miami Marlins, San Francisco Giants, and Boston Red Sox. He is signed to the Caribes de Anzoátegui of the Venezuelan Professional Baseball League.

Early life
Hernández was born on September 7, 1987 in Güiria, Venezuela.

Professional career

Minor leagues
Hernandez signed with the Detroit Tigers in April 2005.  In 2007, as a member of the West Michigan Whitecaps, he was named a Midwest League midseason and posteason All-Star, was chosen as Midwest League MVP, and competed in the All-Star Futures Game for the World Team. On October 29, 2007, Hernández was traded by the Detroit Tigers along with pitcher Jair Jurrjens to the Atlanta Braves in exchange for shortstop Édgar Rentería.

Hernández was listed as the fifth-best prospect in the Atlanta Braves organization by Baseball America. before the 2008 season. On June 3, 2009, the Braves traded Hernández along with Charlie Morton and Jeff Locke to the Pittsburgh Pirates in exchange for Nate McLouth.

Pittsburgh Pirates (2012)
On May 18, 2012, he was called up to the big league club. He made his major league debut on May 21, and struck out as a pinch hitter. On May 27, he got his first major league hit, a 2-run single off Chicago Cubs pitcher Michael Bowden.

Miami Marlins (2012)
On July 31, 2012, the Pirates traded Hernández and a 2013 draft pick to the Miami Marlins for Gaby Sánchez and Kyle Kaminska.

Kansas City Royals
On July 21, 2013, Hernández was traded to the Kansas City Royals organization. Hernández was assigned to the Omaha Storm Chasers, the Royals' Triple-A affiliate. On November 23, 2013, Hernandez re-signed a minor league contract with Kansas City.

Chicago White Sox
On April 10, 2014, Hernández was traded to the Chicago White Sox for cash considerations and assigned to the Triple-A Charlotte Knights. He was released on June 11, 2014.

Return to the Pirates (2015)
Hernández rejoined the Pirates on December 1, 2014, agreeing to a minor league deal that included an invitation to spring training. On June 28, 2015, Gorkys Hernández was called up to the majors and started in right field.

San Francisco Giants (2016–2018)
In 2016, Hernández agreed to a minor league deal with the Giants. The Giants promoted him to the major leagues on August 23 to replace the injured Gregor Blanco. In 2018, due to numerous injuries to the outfield, he was placed as the center fielder for the Giants, establishing career highs offensively.

Boston Red Sox (2019)
On December 11, 2018, Hernández signed a minor league deal with the Boston Red Sox, and was assigned to the Triple-A Pawtucket Red Sox. On September 1, 2019, the Red Sox selected Hernández's contract, adding him to their active MLB roster. He appeared in 20 games with the 2019 Red Sox, batting .143 with two RBIs. With Triple-A Pawtucket, he appeared in 123 games, batting .219 with 16 home runs and 53 RBIs. Hernández was removed from Boston's 40-man roster in October and sent outright to Pawtucket. On October 21, he elected to become a free agent.

Chicago White Sox (second stint)
On February 17, 2020, Hernandez signed a minor league deal with the Chicago White Sox. He was released prior to the season on June 18, 2020.

Mexican League
On December 18, 2020, Hernández signed with the Pericos de Puebla of the Mexican League. In 21 games for Puebla in 2021, Hernández slashed .253/.337/.410 with 4 home runs and 13 RBI. On June 17, 2021, Hernández was traded to the Sultanes de Monterrey. In 12 games for Monterrey, Hernández hit .227/.358/.273 with no home runs or RBI. On July 13, Hernández was released by the Sultanes. On July 17, 2021, Hernández signed with Diablos Rojos del México. In 10 games, Hernández went 4 for 32 with 1 RBI. He was released on August 7, 2021. 

On June 8, 2022, Hernández signed with the Piratas de Campeche. He was released on July 4, 2022. He played in 20 games hitting .254/.365/.302 with 0 home runs and 6 RBIs before his release.

Awards and honors

Gulf Coast League Post Season All-Star (2006)
Midwest League All-Star (2007)
3x All-Star Futures Game participant (2007, 2008, 2010)
Midwest League MVP (2007)
Midwest League Postseason All-Star (2007)
Midwest League All-Star (2008)

See also
 List of Major League Baseball players from Venezuela

References

External links

1987 births
Living people
People from Güiria
Altoona Curve players
Boston Red Sox players
Caribes de Anzoátegui players
Caribes de Oriente players
Charlotte Knights players
Diablos Rojos del México players
Gulf Coast Tigers players
Indianapolis Indians players
Major League Baseball outfielders
Major League Baseball players from Venezuela
Mexican League baseball center fielders
Miami Marlins players
Mississippi Braves players
Myrtle Beach Pelicans players
New Orleans Zephyrs players
Omaha Storm Chasers players
Pawtucket Red Sox players
Pericos de Puebla players
Piratas de Campeche players
Pittsburgh Pirates players
Sacramento River Cats players
San Francisco Giants players
Tigres de Quintana Roo players
Tomateros de Culiacán players
Venezuelan expatriate baseball players in Mexico
Venezuelan expatriate baseball players in the United States
West Michigan Whitecaps players